The Minister of Defence is the highest authority of Spain's Ministry of Defence, which is in charge of the preparation, development and execution of the defense policy determined by its government, as well as the management of the Military Administration.

List of officeholders

Second Spanish Republic (1931–1939)

Francoist Spain (1936–1975)

Kingdom of Spain (1975–present)

See also
 Ministry of Defence (Spain)

Notes and references
Notes

References

Defence